Jay L. Ramsdell (January 30, 1964 – July 19, 1989) was the Commissioner of the Continental Basketball Association (CBA), a professional men's basketball league in the United States, from 1988 until his death.

Continental Basketball Association
As a ninth-grade student in 1978, Ramsdell interviewed the owner of the expansion team the Maine Lumberjacks for an article in his high school newspaper.  The owner was so impressed, he invited Jay to "help out" the team on Opening Night.  That night Jay was assigned to the scorer's table, and by the end of the game he was the Statistical Crew Chief.  Within a week, Jay had assumed the role of the team's Director of Public Relations.

Ramsdell remained with the 'Jacks until his high school graduation in 1982 when he was hired by CBA commissioner Jim Drucker as the league's Administrative Assistant.  Within a year, he was the league's Director of Operations.

He returned to Bangor, Maine, to serve as the General Manager for the Maine Windjammers in 1985–86.  After that franchise folded after one season, at the age of 20, Ramsdell returned to the CBA front office as Deputy Commissioner.

With the resignation of Commissioner Mike Storen in 1988, Jay Ramsdell became the youngest Commissioner in the history of professional sports when he assumed the position at the age of 24.

Death and legacy
Ramsdell and Deputy Commissioner Jerry Schemmel were on  United Airlines Flight 232 on July 19, 1989, and traveling from the league headquarters in Denver to the player draft in Columbus, Ohio, when the plane crash-landed in Sioux City, Iowa, after losing all hydraulics.  Of the 296 passengers and crew on board the flight, Ramsdell was among the 112 passengers who were killed, while Schemmel survived.

In 1989, the CBA league championship trophy was named the Jay Ramsdell Trophy to honor his memory. Ramsdell was posthumously inducted into the Maine Basketball Hall of Fame in 2019.

References

1964 births
1989 deaths
Victims of aviation accidents or incidents in the United States
Accidental deaths in Iowa
American sports businesspeople
Continental Basketball Association commissioners
People from Bangor, Maine
20th-century American businesspeople
Victims of aviation accidents or incidents in 1989